Primary cutaneous adenoid cystic carcinoma is a cutaneous condition characterized by a tumor that usually presents on the chest, scalp, or vulva of middle- to older-aged persons.

Primary cutaneous adenoid cystic carcinomas have been misinterpreted as metastatic lesions.

It was characterized in 1975.

See also 
 Aggressive digital papillary adenocarcinoma
 Mucinous carcinoma
 Skin lesion

References 

Epidermal nevi, neoplasms, and cysts